Emilie Feiza Miller (born August 11, 1936) is an American politician who served as a Democratic member of the Virginia Senate. A legislative aide to Senator Abe Brault, she ran for his seat with his endorsement when he retired in 1983 but lost to Fairfax mayor John W. Russell. She defeated him in a rematch four years later. While in the Senate, she championed the admission of women to Virginia Military Institute. She was defeated for reelection in 1991 by Delegate Jane Woods.

References

External links 
 

1936 births
Living people
Politicians from Chicago
Drake University alumni
Women state legislators in Virginia
Democratic Party Virginia state senators
20th-century American politicians
20th-century American women politicians
21st-century American women